Daniel Goldstein is a US-based Israeli politician. In Israel, he is known for co-founding the Calcala Party with his brother Benny Goldstein. He has also held political office in the United States.

Early career
Prior to entering politics, Goldstein worked as an electrician. In 1999, he founded Daniels Electric. In 2010, Goldstein joined E&M Management, a realty company that attracted controversy for its business tactics.

Politics
In 2012, Daniel Goldstein, along with his brother Benny Goldstein, founded the Calcala Party in Israel. The name translates to "Finance Party" in Hebrew. Benny Goldstein had been arrested for failure to pay child support, and the brothers reportedly founded the Calcala Party to promote the reformation of laws targeted at divorced men.

Daniel Goldstein ran for the Israeli legislative election in 2013 and 2015. In the US, he is currently serving his third term as Village Trustee of Lawrence, New York.

See also
 2013 Israeli legislative election
 2015 Israeli legislative election

References 

Year of birth missing (living people)
Living people
American emigrants to Israel
American Jews
American real estate businesspeople
Businesspeople from New York (state)
Israeli Jews
Israeli people of American-Jewish descent
Jewish Israeli politicians
People from Lawrence, Nassau County, New York
People from Waterville, Maine
Politicians from Nassau County, New York